Ruhollah Hazratpour (born 1984) is an Iranian politician. He was born in Urmia, West Azerbaijan province. He is a member of the tenth Islamic Consultative Assembly from the electorate of Urmia, He and Hadi Bahadori were qualified in the second round. in the past Bahadori was member of fourth Urmia city council. Mohammad Hazratpour mayor of Urmia is his uncle and father-in-law.

References

People from Urmia
Deputies of Urmia
Living people
1984 births
Members of the 10th Islamic Consultative Assembly
Islamic Azad University alumni